The provinces of Sierra Leone are divided into 16 districts, as of July 2017. Previously, the country was divided into 14 districts. The Western Area is divided into two districts. Sierra Leone's capital Freetown is located in the Western Area of the country and its makes up the Western Area Urban District.

One traditional leader from each district occupies a seat in Sierra Leone's parliament. Each one of Sierra Leone's sixteen administrative districts (with the exception of the Western Area Urban District) is governed by a directly elected district council headed by a council chairman. The national capital Freetown, which makes up the Western Area Urban District, and the other is the Western Area Rural with a main town known as Waterloo, is governed by a directly elected city council headed by a mayor. The districts are further divided into a total of 190 (prior to 2017, 149) chiefdoms, whose elected leaders provided most of local government from 1896 to 2004, when they were supplemented by elected local councils.

List of districts

See also 
 Subdivisions of Sierra Leone
List of districts of Sierra Leone by Human Development Index

References

 
Subdivisions of Sierra Leone
Sierra Leone, Districts
Sierra Leone 2
Districts, Sierra Leone
Sierra Leone geography-related lists